Sleaford is a market town and civil parish in the North Kesteven district of the non-metropolitan county of Lincolnshire, England. This list includes the 181 listed buildings in the civil parish of Sleaford, which incorporates the village of Quarrington and the hamlet of Holdingham in addition to the town. One is classified by English Heritage as being in Grade I, six in Grade II* and 174 in Grade II. In the United Kingdom, the term "listed building" refers to a building or other structure officially designated as being of special architectural, historical or cultural significance. These buildings are in three grades: Grade I consists of buildings of outstanding architectural or historical interest; Grade II* includes particularly significant buildings of more than local interest; Grade II consists of buildings of special architectural or historical interest. Buildings in England are listed by the Secretary of State for Culture, Media and Sport on recommendations provided by English Heritage, which also determines the grading.

A small number of medieval buildings have survived. St Denys' Church in Sleaford and St Botolph's in Quarrington date to the 12th and 13th centuries respectively, while Sleaford's half-timbered vicarage is 15th-century. Cogglesford Mill is the only remaining watermill in the town and it is a testament to the economic importance of the River Slea from the late Saxon period onwards. By the Norman Conquest, a market was held at Sleaford and it had developed into an estate centre; the Bishops of Lincoln used it as a base, constructing Sleaford Castle, but also as a means of extracting produce and wealth through demesne farming and the granting of limited freedoms to the town. As a result, the oldest parts of the town are the market place and the four roads which meet at it: Northgate, Southgate, Eastgate and Westgate; many of the listed buildings are found in this area.

These buildings date to the 18th and 19th centuries and include William Alvey's fine baroque house on Northgate, the Manor House on Northgate inset with medieval fragments, and Sessions House on the Market Place. The Carre family, who owned the manor in the early modern period, were responsible for the grammar school, the hospital and the almshouses, while the Victorian builders Kirk and Parry constructed or added to numerous public buildings and private residences, including Lafford Terrace and their own houses on Southgate and at Westholme respectively.

During the Industrial Revolution, the Slea was canalised in 1794 and the Sleaford Navigation which managed it constructed its offices and wharves along Carre Street. The canal brought trade to Sleaford, while the new gasworks powered lamps around the town from 1834. Over twenty years later, the railways arrived and the station was built in a Gothic style. Sleaford's agricultural location and its new transport links encouraged seed trading and malting in the late 19th century: the seed merchant Charles Sharpe's house, The Pines, is on Boston Road, while the massive Bass and Co. maltings complex off Mareham Lane is grade II* listed.

Key

Listed buildings

References

Citations

Bibliography

Sleaford
Sleaford
Lists of listed buildings in Lincolnshire